Islampur Government Polytechnic, is a government polytechnic located in Islampur, Uttar Dinajpur, West Bengal, India. This polytechnic college is affiliated to the West Bengal State Council of Technical Education,  and recognised by AICTE, New Delhi. This polytechnic offers diploma courses in electrical, electrical and electronics and survey engineering.

References

External links

Universities and colleges in Uttar Dinajpur district
Educational institutions established in 2014
2014 establishments in West Bengal
Technical universities and colleges in West Bengal